The Pleissenburg (German: Pleißenburg) was a historical building in the city of Leipzig in Saxony which is in modern-day Germany. It was built in the 13th century by the Margrave Dietrick and named after the river Pleisse which runs nearby. Martin Luther gave the first evangelical sermon in the castle chapel on Pentecost Sunday in 1539.

After heavy damage during the siege in the Schmalkaldic War in 1547, the Elector Maurice of Saxony built a fortification with moats. After the Thirty Years War the castle lost its significance and was used as an administrative building and barracks. In the 18th century the newly founded Leipzig Art Academy was based in the Pleissenburg and Johann Wolfgang von Goethe studied here. The naturalist Wilhelm Gottlieb Tilesius von Tilenau also studied here.

The New Town Hall stands today on the site where the Pleissenburg stood.

Further reading
 
 Ulrich Schütte: Das Schloss als Wehranlage. Befestigte Schlossbauten der frühen Neuzeit im alten Reich. Darmstadt, 1994, pp. 56–59.

External links
 

Buildings and structures in Leipzig